Liu Changcheng (born 10 April 1961) is a Chinese alpine skier. He competed in two events at the 1984 Winter Olympics.

References

1961 births
Living people
Chinese male alpine skiers
Olympic alpine skiers of China
Alpine skiers at the 1984 Winter Olympics
Skiers from Jilin
20th-century Chinese people